Bothin may refer to:
Bothin, California
Bothin Marsh